The filmography of English actor Robert Bathurst comprises both film and television roles spanning almost 30 years. Bathurst made his acting debut for television in 1982 in the never-broadcast pilot episode for the BBC sitcom Blackadder, though his character Prince Henry was recast when the Black Adder series was commissioned. Throughout the rest of the 1980s, Bathurst appeared in episodes of The Lenny Henry Show, Who Dares Wins, The District Nurse, Red Dwarf, and Chelmsford 123, before starring alongside his Cambridge Footlights colleague Stephen Fry in the short-run series Anything More Would Be Greedy. He also appeared in the films Whoops Apocalypse (1986) and Just Ask for Diamond (1988).

Into the 1990s, Bathurst gained wider recognition from television audiences, first as writer Mark Taylor in Joking Apart from 1991 to 1995, then as David Marsden in Cold Feet from 1997 to 2003 and again from 2016. The decade also saw him appear in the television series The House of Eliott, The Detectives, and Hornblower, and the films Twenty-One (1991) and Terry Jones's The Wind in the Willows (1996).

In the early 2000s, Bathurst starred in a succession of one-off television dramas before taking the role of British prime minister Michael Phillips in the sitcom My Dad's the Prime Minister. Throughout the rest of the decade, he appeared in episodes of New Tricks, Agatha Christie's Poirot, and Kingdom, played Mark Thatcher in the fact-based drama Coup!, had a recurring role in the sitcom My Family, and starred in the costume drama Emma. He starred as John Le Mesurier in the Hattie Jacques television biopic Hattie and returned to a weekly TV series role in Wild at Heart in 2012.

Alongside his television and film roles, Bathurst has developed a theatre career. He appeared in several Cambridge Footlights Revues between 1977 and 1981, and co-directed the 1978 Footlights pantomime with Martin Bergman. From his first professional stage role playing Tim Allgood in Michael Frayn's Noises Off (1983), Bathurst has starred in Judgement (1987), Getting Married (1993), The Nose (1995), The Rover (1996), Alarms and Excursions (1998–1999), The Three Sisters (2003), Whipping it Up (2006, 2007), Present Laughter (2010), and Blithe Spirit (2010, 2011).

Filmography

Television

Film

Theatre

Music video

Footnotes

References 

Male actor filmographies
British filmographies